Temporal logic of actions (TLA) is a logic developed by Leslie Lamport, which combines temporal logic with a logic of actions.
It is used to describe behaviours of concurrent and distributed systems. It is the logic underlying the specification language TLA+.

Details 
The meaning of the non-primed variables is the variable's value in this state. The meaning of primed variables is the variable's value in the next state.
The above expression means the value of x today, plus the value of x tomorrow times the value of y today, equals the value of y tomorrow.

This allows for stuttering steps, in which none of the program variables change their values.

See also
 Dynamic logic (modal logic)
 Temporal logic
 PlusCal
 TLA+

References

External links
 
 
 

Temporal logic
Concurrency (computer science)